Sihai may refer to:

 Four Seas, the four bodies of water that metaphorically made up the boundaries of ancient China
 Sihai, Beijing, a town in Beijing
 Sihai, Manipur, a village in Ukhrul district of India
 Only Fools Rush In, a 2022 film also known as Sihai